The Camille O. and William H. Cosby Collection of African American Art is a private collection of over sixty pieces of African-American art owned by entertainer Bill Cosby and his wife Camille.

The first substantial loan of the collection was to the Smithsonian Institution's National Museum of African Art for its 50th anniversary. The exhibition Conversations: African and African American Artworks in Dialogue, took place from 2014 to 2016.

List of artists collected
 Romare Bearden
 Elizabeth Catlett
 Beauford Delaney
 Loïs Mailou Jones
 Jacob Lawrence
 Keith Morrison
 Faith Ringgold
 Augusta Savage
 Henry Ossawa Tanner - The Thankful Poor
 Alma Thomas

References

Bill Cosby
African-American art